Beatrice Emma (Barrett) Altmeyer (November 15, 1916 – August 26, 2002) was an American amateur golfer.

Barrett was born in Chicago, Illinois. In 1938, she won the Women's Western Open, now considered an LPGA major championship. She won ten Minnesota state golf tournaments between 1933 and 1962, competing under both her maiden and married names.

Altmeyer was elected to the Minnesota Golf Hall of Fame in 1989. She died in St. Louis Park, Minnesota.

Tournament wins (11)
this list may be incomplete
1938 Women's Western Open
Minnesota Women's State Match Play Championship (1933, 1937, 1946, 1947, 1958, 1961)
Minnesota Women's State Amateur Championship (1947, 1950, 1958, 1962)

Major championships

Wins (1)

See also
Chronological list of LPGA major golf champions
List of golfers with most LPGA major championship wins

References

American female golfers
Amateur golfers
Winners of LPGA major golf championships
Golfers from Minnesota
Golfers from Chicago
1916 births
2002 deaths
20th-century American women
20th-century American people